Vitantonio "Tonio" Liuzzi (born 6 August 1980) is an Italian professional racing driver who formerly raced in Formula One for the Red Bull, Toro Rosso, Force India and HRT teams.

Karting
Born in Locorotondo, BA, Apulia, Liuzzi, like many auto racing drivers, began his career in kart racing (at age 9). He won the 1993 Italian Karting Championship, and in 1995 took second in the Karting World Championship and placed fifth in the European Championship. He won the Karting World Championship in 2001. He beat Formula One champion Michael Schumacher at Kerpen, Schumacher's 'home' track.

Formula Renault, F3 and F3000

Liuzzi then moved to cars, finishing second in the 2001 German Formula Renault Championship. Racing in the German Formula Three Championship, however, he scored only ninth place. That same year he did win the Imola International F3 race and had test drives for the Coloni Formula 3000 team and Williams, the Formula One constructor. Red Bull hired Liuzzi for the 2003 F3000 season, in which he finished fourth. He moved to the Arden team for the following F3000 season, where he won seven of the ten races, securing the title with one race left.

Formula One (2005–2012)

Winter 2004 Formula One speculation
Liuzzi's performance in Formula 3000 led to speculation that Ferrari might employ him, either as a test driver at their Formula One team, or at Sauber, the Formula One team that Ferrari had a close association with as its longtime engine supplier. He did have a test drive with Sauber in September 2004, but shortly before he tested they announced they had signed former World Champion Jacques Villeneuve to a two-year contract. In November 2004 Liuzzi was given a test drive by Red Bull, who hired him for 2005 in January.

Red Bull (2005)

Initially it seemed that he might be given the seat along with David Coulthard, but Red Bull chose Christian Klien, leaving Liuzzi as the test driver. Despite good performances by Klien in the first three races, Red Bull abided by an agreement they made before the season that both he and Klien would be able to race. Liuzzi would replace Klien for the San Marino, Spanish and Monaco Grands Prix. Liuzzi scored his maiden point on his debut after both BAR drivers were disqualified at San Marino. Following the Spanish Grand Prix and Monaco, he was given one more race at the European Grand Prix, before his seat was returned to Klien for the Canadian Grand Prix.

Toro Rosso (2006–2007)

Following Red Bull's purchase of the Minardi team – thereafter renamed Scuderia Toro Rosso, Italian for Team Red Bull – Liuzzi was rewarded with a full-season seat in the "B-team". At the 2006 United States Grand Prix, he scored the team's first point, with an eighth-place finish after a race-long battle with Coulthard and Nico Rosberg.

Liuzzi was confirmed with the team for the  season at the launch of the STR2 on 13 February 2007. Unfortunately, during the first half of his season his races were plagued by mistakes similar to his former teammate's. He seemed likely to score his first points of the season at Canada, but instead he crashed into the infamous "Wall of Champions" at the exit of the final chicane. He also faced constant speculation over keeping his seat, as the team openly courted both Sebastian Vettel and Champcar series champion Sébastien Bourdais. His teammate Scott Speed claimed Red Bull wanted to replace both himself and Liuzzi. Once Bourdais' contract for 2008 was announced, Liuzzi's performances improved. After being denied a world championship point in Japan by a post-race time penalty, he drove what many consider the best race of his Formula One career in China. Narrowly missing out on Q3 by qualifying 11th, he gained three places at the start, then overtook Mark Webber of the 'works' Red Bull team, as well as the BMW of Nick Heidfeld. Throughout the race he kept pace with 5th-placed Jenson Button's Honda, and held off a late charge from Heidfeld to finish 6th and collect three points.

Force India (2008–2010)

On 10 August 2007 Toro Rosso confirmed that Sébastien Bourdais would drive for them in 2008, leaving Liuzzi without a seat. Liuzzi's manager, former Lotus boss Peter Collins, confirmed that Liuzzi wished to continue his involvement in F1. He had been linked to a test drive role with Williams, but it eventually went to Nico Hülkenberg. He then secured the role of test driver for the Force India F1 team on 10 January 2008.

On 3 September 2009, Force India released Fisichella so he could replace Luca Badoer at Ferrari, who had filled in for two races for injured driver Felipe Massa. On 7 September 2009, Force India announced that Liuzzi would drive for them in the remaining five races of the 2009 Formula One season. He made his race debut for Force India at the 2009 Italian Grand Prix and qualified an impressive seventh, given the fact he started the race with a heavier fuel load than his younger teammate Sutil. He was running solidly in the points, before retiring after 22 laps with a transmission problem.

On 27 November 2009 Force India announced that it kept Adrian Sutil and Liuzzi as drivers for 2010.

Liuzzi achieved his first-points scoring finish since the 2007 Chinese Grand Prix in the season-opening 2010 Bahrain Grand Prix. He finished ninth in the race, picking up two points due to the introduction of a new points system in Formula One in 2010. At the following round in Australia, he finished seventh in changeable weather conditions collecting a further six points. In Monaco Liuzzi finished ninth, scoring another two points for Force India. In the race, Liuzzi finished ninth after tangling with Felipe Massa at the first corner. He scored another point at Spa-Francorchamps, after Jaime Alguersuari was penalised post-race for gaining an advantage from cutting the Bus Stop chicane in the closing laps.

HRT (2011–2012)

Liuzzi was considered as a possible replacement for Robert Kubica at Lotus Renault GP for the 2011 season, after Kubica sustained life-threatening injuries in a rally crash in Italy on 8 February. However, despite rumours suggesting that Kubica wanted Liuzzi to be his replacement, the team opted to employ Nick Heidfeld to fill the role instead.

Subsequently, Liuzzi was announced that he would be testing for Hispania Racing at Circuit de Catalunya, as the Spanish team evaluated him for their second race seat alongside Narain Karthikeyan. Liuzzi was confirmed in this role on 9 March 2011. He recorded his first finishes with the team with a pair of 22nd-place finishes in China and Turkey but retired in Spain with a gearbox issue. He took a 16th-place finish in Monaco, and a 13th place in Canada, Hispania's best finish to date. Liuzzi finished as the final classified finisher in Hungary (20th), and Belgium (19th), before a first-lap retirement in Italy after contact with Heikki Kovalainen. As a result of the contact, Liuzzi slid across the grass and directly into Vitaly Petrov and Nico Rosberg. He finished as the final classified finisher in Singapore (20th), Japan (23rd) and Korea (21st).

Liuzzi returned to his race seat in Abu Dhabi however, and again finished as the final classified finisher, in twentieth place. In the final race at Brazil, he qualified 21st ahead of his teammate Ricciardo and both of the Virgin cars and was running ahead of Ricciardo in the race when he was forced to retire from the race due to an alternator failure on lap 61.

In February 2012 it was announced that Narain Karthikeyan had been handed the final race seat; leaving Liuzzi without a drive.

Superstars Series (2012–2013)
Without a drive in Formula One, Liuzzi looked for other racing options. He eventually joined the International Superstars Series for the 2012 season, driving for CAAL Racing in a Mercedes C63 AMG. He took his first podium finish at the first race during the first round in Monza, and he took his first win of the season during the second race of that round.

Super GT and Super Formula (2014)

In 2014, Liuzzi moved to Japan and competed in Super GT (GT500 class) and Super Formula. In his first season of Super GT, he drove for the Autobacs Racing Team Aguri (ARTA) team along with Kosuke Matsuura.

Racing record

Career summary

 As Liuzzi was a guest driver, he was ineligible to score points.

Complete International Formula 3000 results
(key) (Races in bold indicate pole position; races in italics indicate fastest lap)

Complete Formula One results
(key) (Races in bold indicate pole position; races in italics indicate fastest lap)

 Driver did not finish the Grand Prix, but was classified as he completed over 90% of the race distance.

Complete A1 Grand Prix results
(key) (Races in bold indicate pole position; races in italics indicate fastest lap)

Complete Speedcar Series results
(key) (Races in bold indicate pole position; races in italics indicate fastest lap)

Complete V8 Supercar results
(key) (Races in bold indicate pole position; races in italics indicate fastest lap)

+ Not Eligible for points

Complete International Superstars Series results
(key) (Races in bold indicate pole position; races in italics indicate fastest lap)

Complete FIA World Endurance Championship results
(key) (Races in bold indicate pole position)

Complete Super GT results
(key) (Races in bold indicate pole position; races in italics indicate fastest lap)

Complete Super Formula results
(key) (Races in bold indicate pole position; races in italics indicate fastest lap)

Complete Formula E results
(key) (Races in bold indicate pole position; races in italics indicate fastest lap)

Personal
In addition to his native Italian, Liuzzi speaks English and French. He was previously known for his piercings in his left upper ear, left eyebrow and left lower ear. He is married to Francesca Caldarelli which made Liuzzi a brother-in-law of Andrea Caldarelli.

In 2013, Liuzzi and Johnny Herbert mentored 6 contestants in a primetime ITV4 reality series, with the aim of taking players of the Gran Turismo videogames to the Dubai 24 Hour race as real drivers. Other countries in Europe had heats mentored by Sébastien Buemi.

Notes

References

External links

 
 

1980 births
Living people
Sportspeople from Pescara
Italian racing drivers
Italian Formula One drivers
International Formula 3000 Champions
International Formula 3000 drivers
A1 Team Italy drivers
German Formula Three Championship drivers
German Formula Renault 2.0 drivers
Formula Renault Eurocup drivers
Speedcar Series drivers
Karting World Championship drivers
Supercars Championship drivers
Red Bull Formula One drivers
Toro Rosso Formula One drivers
Force India Formula One drivers
HRT Formula One drivers
Superstars Series drivers
FIA World Endurance Championship drivers
Super GT drivers
Super Formula drivers
Formula E drivers
Stock Car Brasil drivers
International GT Open drivers
Arden International drivers
French Formula Three Championship drivers
Italian Formula Three Championship drivers
A1 Grand Prix drivers
Asian Le Mans Series drivers
Opel Team BSR drivers
Kolles Racing drivers
RC Motorsport drivers
RSM Marko drivers
Team Aguri drivers
Super Nova Racing drivers